The Administrator of Veterans Affairs was the head of the Veterans Administration, a United States Government agency responsible for military veterans benefits. The administrator was appointed by the President. In 1989, the Veterans Administration was replaced by the United States Department of Veterans Affairs, with the Secretary of Veterans Affairs (a member of the cabinet) as its head.

Derwinski went on to become the first Secretary of Veterans Affairs.

Directors of Veterans Bureau 

Before the VA was established on July 21, 1930, its functions were carried out by the U.S. Veterans’ Bureau, the Bureau of Pensions of the Interior Department, and the National Home for Disabled Volunteer Soldiers. The director of the Veterans' Bureau corresponds somewhat with the later position of Administrator.

External links 
 List of all VA heads

History of veterans' affairs in the United States
United States Department of Veterans Affairs
USA